The Ministry of the Air was a government department of Spain that was tasked with oversight of both the Spanish Air Force (Ejército del Aire) and civil aviation during the Francoist regime.

The ministry was created on 8 August 1939, after the end of the Spanish Civil War. It was dissolved on 4 July 1977 by the Royal Decree 1558/77, being merged with the Ministry of Defence as part of the transition to democracy.

History 

The three branches of the Armed Forces (Army, Navy and Air Force) were grouped under its control. The Ministry of the Air was created in the second government of Francisco Franco; it was defined and regulated by Law of 8 August 1939, whose organization and functions were delimited by Decree of 1 September 1939. General Juan Yagüe was appointed Minister, with Fernando Barron as Undersecretary.

After the end of the Civil War, Yagüe intended to build a new Air Force out of the Aviación Nacional with the help of Nazi Germany and Fascist Italy, and with the clear intention of participating in World War II on the side of the Axis powers. At the beginning of World War II the new Air Force had 14 regiments and 3 groups, composed in turn by 172 fighters and 164 bombers of different types, along with 82 assisting planes and 75 other devices of different types captured from the Spanish Republican Air Force. The reports issued by the General Staff, however, left in evidence the bad state in which the airplanes were, the lack of spare parts and fuel. In the end, the project to expand the Air Force was a failure given the situation in the country, and Yagüe was dismissed and replaced by General Juan Vigón. Since 1940, different locations in Madrid were searched for the future headquarters of the Ministry, and after several options a site in the district of Moncloa-Aravaca was chosen. The lots are acquired by the City Council of Madrid, under then Mayor of Madrid Alberto Alcocer y Ribacoba; General Vigón instructed architect Luis Gutiérrez Soto on the renovation of the area and the design of the new building. Although the Ministry of the Air building was not completed until 1958, it was already fulfilling its mission in 1954.

The Ministry was abolished by the Royal Decree 1558/77 of 4 July 1977, when Prime Minister Adolfo Suárez created the Ministry of Defence as part of his second government (formed following the 1977 general election), which integrated the ministries of the Army, Navy and Air Force during the transition to democracy.

Organic structure 
On 5 September 1939 the structure of the Ministry was organized, being composed of the following departments:

 .
 Undersecretary, overseeing general directorates of: Civil Aviation, Personnel, Infrastructure, Material and Antiaeronautics (anti-aircraft).
 Senior Advisory Council.
 Private Secretary of the Minister.
 General and Technical Secretariat.
 Political Secretariat.
 Administrative Technical Board.
 Legal advice.

List of ministers

See also 
 Chief of Staff of the Air Force (Spain)

References

Bibliography 
 
 
 

Defunct departments of the Spanish Government
Ministries established in 1939
Ministries disestablished in 1977
1939 establishments in Spain
1977 disestablishments in Spain
Aviation organisations based in Spain